Simon Kennewell (born 2 January 1997) is a professional Rugby Union player. He represents Australia in sevens rugby. Born in Collaroy, New South Wales, Kennewell joined the Australian Sevens program in September 2015 after impressing at the national Sevens championships in March and then at the 2015 Commonwealth Youth Games in Samoa. A series of powerful performances at the high-class event in Apia in September 2015 persuaded the national Sevens program to offer him a permanent contract while still at school.

Kennewell has gone on to earn a further 23 World Series caps, accumulating 43 tries and selection in two HSBC Dream Team. Kennewell has been a main figure in the nation's sevens setup since cementing his spot in the team. In the sevens format of the game, Kennewell plays as a centre or forward.

Whilst in the sevens program, Kennewell was also selected in the Australian U-20s team to compete at the U-20s World Cup in both 2016 and 2017 where he featured predominantly as a centre or wing.

Born and bred in Sydney, Australia, Kennewell also has English heritage and eligibility. Representative Honours include Newington College 1st XV (2013–15), Australian Schoolboys 2014 and 2015, Australian U20s 2016 and 2017, and Australian Mens 7s team from 2016-present.

References

1997 births
People educated at Newington College
Australian rugby union players
Male rugby sevens players
Australia international rugby sevens players
Living people